The Burlington Limestone is a geologic formation in Missouri, Iowa and the Midwest region. It preserves fossils dating back to the Mississippian subperiod.

Physical properties 
Burlington Limestone is unusually course-grained, crystalline, crinoidal limestone. Its texture is sufficiently distinctive and persistent to permit recognition of the formation commonly on this basis alone. The Burlington Limestone is made of almost entirely on the remains of various fossils, by far the most important of which are crinoids. Some portions of the Burlington, however, are not so evidently crinoidal, as for example, the so-called "white ledge" quarried in the northeastern part of Missouri.

Natural occurrence 
Burlington Limestone is present in nearly all major Mississippian outcrop regions in Missouri.  It is known from Iowa to northwestern Arkansas and from western Illinois to western Kansas. It is present throughout Missouri, except in the Ozark uplift, where it has been removed by erosion. Differentiation of the Burlington with the overlaying, lithologically similar Keokuk Limestone is often difficult or impossible, so the sequence of Osagean limestones is sometimes identified as "Burlington-Keokuk Limestone".

See also

 List of fossiliferous stratigraphic units in Missouri
 List of fossiliferous stratigraphic units in Iowa
 Paleontology in Missouri

References

External links
 

Carboniferous Missouri
Carboniferous Iowa
Carboniferous southern paleotropical deposits